Karol Knap (born 12 September 2001) is a Polish professional footballer who plays as a midfielder for Cracovia.

Career statistics

References

External links

2001 births
Living people
People from Krosno
Association football midfielders
Polish footballers
Poland youth international footballers
Karpaty Krosno players
Puszcza Niepołomice players
MKS Cracovia (football) players
Ekstraklasa players
I liga players
III liga players
IV liga players